The Nürburgring Endurance Series (NLS, German: Nürburgring Langstrecken-Serie) is an organisation of motorsport clubs of which each hosts one event of a nine-race series held on the Nürburgring Nordschleife.

Participants of NLS races range from amateurs in small road legal cars with rollcages and harnesses to professional factory teams racing Group GT3 cars. The NLS series is closely associated with the 24 Hours Nürburgring, as it has similar rules (mostly), and mainly the same participants. In the calendar, several weeks around the 24h date in May/June are taken off to allow teams to prepare for the 24h, and to fix their cars afterwards. The 24h is not part of the championship anymore, though.

Name
The series was formerly known as VLN (German: Veranstaltergemeinschaft Langstreckenpokal Nürburgring, Association of Nürburgring Endurance Cup Organisers). The series was named "BFGoodrich Langstreckenmeisterschaft (BFGLM)" from 2001 to 2009.

History
The VLN was founded in 1977 by several motorsport clubs, which are members of ADAC or Deutscher Motorsport Verband (DMV), in order to join forces. Previously, each club had run its own touring car racing event on the Nürburgring, lasting for 3.5 to 6 hours, with about 150 cars and 400 drivers taking part. The rules were unified and the races were made part of a series.

The winners of the series were awarded a Cup (German Pokal), sponsored by Valvoline and later Veedol lubrication products. Due to this, both organisation and races were simply informally called "Veedol-Cup" for many years. Since the change of sponsorship and the official recognition by Deutscher Motor Sport Bund (DMSB) as the German endurance championship (German Meisterschaft) in 2001, the former Veedol Langstreckenpokal Nürburgring was the BFGoodrich Langstreckenmeisterschaft Nürburgring. The championship was renamed the NLS in 2020, however the name of the VLN organisation stays the same.

Apart from the 24 Hours, the Rundstrecken Challenge Nürburgring (RCN/CHC) and GLP are related smaller events dedicated to non-professionals.

Races
Each VLN race is held as a "one-day event" on Saturdays only, in order to limit costs. The mandatory drivers briefing is at 07:30, practice is from 08:20 to 10:00, following a warmup lap behind safety cars, the first of three groups starts the race at 12:00, followed by the other two a few minutes later, in time before the fastest cars complete their first lap in just over 8 minutes. After parc fermé is opened and the winners are honoured, the teams can travel home on race day. At some events, the schedule also accommodates additional sprint races of visiting other series, mainly classic cars and youngtimers.

The "Nürburgring 6 Hours" is considered the season highlight – in 1998, even Sir Jack Brabham took part, at age 72. Here, 2 to 4 drivers per cars are entered, while in all others races, a single driver can drive all alone for 4 hours, or up to 3 can form a team. There are two other standout races – the VLN-6 "Barbarossapreis", in which Michael Schumacher's success with Scuderia Ferrari in Formula One is honoured with all podium placegetters receiving red wigs; and the VLN-9 "Münsterlandpokal" or "Schinkenrennen" (ham race), where large pieces of ham from the Münsterland area are presented to class winners.

Most of the fans watch the race on the Nordschleife. To get to the favourite viewing points it is often necessary to take a walk. Several sections, including "Schwedenkreuz", "Adenauer Forst", "Karussell", and "Wippermann", are up to a kilometer away from the nearest main road. Easy to reach and always well attended are sections such as "Breidscheid", "Brünnchen", and "Pflanzgarten". Around the whole Nordschleife no entrance fee is raised. Just for the paddock and the grandstands on the Grand Prix circuit of the Nürburgring tickets for the price of 18 € are required.

Car classes
A variety of cars compete at the same time during each race. In the 2009 season, there were 30 classes of cars in four divisions.
The Series Cars division is intended to allow relatively low cost racing with near-series cars. It consists of six gasoline classes differentiated by engine displacement V1 to V6 and a diesel class VD.
The Specials division consists of pure race cars that may compete in other race series. It consists of the classes SP1 to SP8 differentiated by engine displacement with an optional suffix T for turbo charged engines, the SP9 class for FIA GT3 cars, the SP10 class for SRO GT4 cars, the special E1-XP 2009 class and the D1T to D4T classes differentiated by engine displacement for diesel cars.
The Cup division consists of one-make cup cars in the classes Cup1: Seat Leon, Cup2: Honda Civic R, Cup3: Porsche Carrera Cup.
The H division consists of cars made in 1996 and before. It consists of the classes H1 to H4 differentiated by engine displacement.

Member organisations
ADAC-Westfalen e.V.
Renngemeinschaft Düren e.V. DMV
AC Altkreis Schwelm e.V. im ADAC
MSC Adenau e.V. im ADAC
Dortmunder MC e.V. im ADAC
Rheydter Club für Motorsport e.V. DMV
MSC Ruhr-Blitz Bochum e.V. im ADAC
MSC Sinzig e.V. im ADAC
AC Monheim e.V. DMV
MSC Münster e.V. DMV

Champions

Notable drivers

See also
Auteg Motorsport
Manthey Racing

References

External links
  
  
 VLN champions
 24 Hours of Nürburgring Race (2006; from archive.org)
 VLN Divisions and Classes 
 To take part in one of the VLN races

Auto racing organizations
Auto racing series in Germany
Auto racing series in West Germany
GT4 (sports car class)